The Columbus School District encompasses an area of approximately  in Columbia, Dodge and Dane counties.

Schools

The Columbus School District operates three public schools and one charter school.
Columbus Elementary School: Grades K-5
Discovery Charter School
Columbus Middle School: Grades 6-8
Columbus Senior High School: Grades 9-12

Governance
The superintendent of schools is Jacob Flood.

References

External links
Columbus School District

School districts in Wisconsin
Education in Columbia County, Wisconsin
Education in Dane County, Wisconsin
Education in Dodge County, Wisconsin